In peak bagging terminology in the United States, the Southern Sixers refers to the group of mountains in the southern states of North Carolina and Tennessee with elevations above sea level of at least six thousand feet (1829 m). The southern sixers are the tallest group of mountains in the eastern United States and the only peaks in the Appalachian Mountains besides New Hampshire's Mount Washington to exceed 6,000 feet.

Most of these mountains are located in the Great Smoky Mountains National Park (abbreviated GSMNP in the list), Mount Mitchell State Park (MMSP), along the Blue Ridge Parkway (BRP), or in the Cherokee or Pisgah National Forest. There are a few, though, that are located on private property. All of these mountains are located within  of the North Carolina - Tennessee border, with 12 on the state border itself and many more on various county borders.

Those who complete a list of 40 of these peaks are awarded membership in the South Beyond 6000 club.

List of Southern Sixers

Map

The locator map below shows the locations of those Southern Sixers with more than one thousand feet of topographic prominence or considerable isolation.

See also
List of mountains in North Carolina
List of mountains of the United States

References
 Peakbagger
 Tarheel High Points
 Tennessee 1,000' Prominence

External links 
 Mount Mitchell State Park
 Great Smoky Mountains National Park
 Blue Ridge Parkway
 Cherokee National Forest

 
Blue Ridge Mountains
Mountains of North Carolina
Mountains of Tennessee
Peak bagging in the United States